Oleksandrivka Raion was one of the raions of Donetsk Oblast, located in southeastern Ukraine. The administrative center of the raion was the urban-type settlement of Oleksandrivka. The raion was abolished on 18 July 2020 as part of the administrative reform of Ukraine, which reduced the number of raions of Donetsk Oblast to eight, of which only five were controlled by the government.

Demographics
According to the 2001 Ukrainian Census:

References

Former raions of Donetsk Oblast
1923 establishments in Ukraine
Ukrainian raions abolished during the 2020 administrative reform